It's the Heart That Dies Last is a Canadian drama film, directed by Alexis Durand-Brault and released in 2017.

Based on the 2013 novel by Robert Lalonde, the film stars Gabriel Sabourin as Julian, a writer who has broken through to popular success with a memoir of his dysfunctional family. He reunites with his estranged mother (Denise Filiatrault), only to learn that she is suffering from Alzheimer's disease and wants Julian's help in ending her life.

Cast
 Denise Filiatrault - Madame Lapierre at 82
 Gabriel Sabourin - Julien
 Sophie Lorain - Madame Lapierre at 48 
 Paul Doucet - Henri
 Geneviève Rioux - Marie-Ève
 Céline Bonnier - Catherine
 Isabelle Blais - Martine
 Robert Lalonde - Le Barman
 Monique Mercure - Tante Pierrette
 Guy Sprung : Gouverneur général 
 Karelle Tremblay - young Marie-Ève jeune

Accolades
The film received six nominations at the 6th Canadian Screen Awards in 2018, including Best Motion Picture.

References

External links
 

2017 films
Canadian drama films
Films directed by Alexis Durand-Brault
Films based on Canadian novels
2017 drama films
French-language Canadian films
2010s Canadian films
2010s French-language films